Bryan James Sledge (born November 23, 1984), better known by his stage name BJ the Chicago Kid (or simply BJ), is an American singer and songwriter. Born and raised in Chicago, Illinois, Sledge is best known for frequently collaborating with Top Dawg Entertainment recording artists Schoolboy Q, Ab-Soul, Kendrick Lamar, and Jay Rock. He has also worked with several other prominent rappers, such as Freddie Gibbs, Warren G, Nekfeu, Big K.R.I.T., GLC, Kanye West, Anderson .Paak, and Joey Badass, among numerous others.

Sledge's first work in the music industry was on a Dave Hollister record in 2001, titled "For You", which he co-wrote alongside Gerald Haddon. Sledge's vocals were first featured on a high-profile single in 2006, a song by Chicago rapper Kanye West titled "Impossible", released in promotion for the 2006 American film Mission: Impossible III. In February 2012, he independently released his debut studio album, Pineapple Now-Laters. Sledge subsequently secured a record deal with Motown, in August 2012. The label then serviced the Pineapple Now-Laters song "Good Luv'n", as Sledge's commercial debut single.

Life and career

1984–2008: Early life and career beginnings
Bryan Sledge was born to church choir directors in Chicago, Illinois. He grew up in the Brainerd neighborhood on Chicago's South Side. Sledge became inspired to pursue a music career after seeing Janet Jackson perform on tour. At the age of 19, he moved to Los Angeles, California, where he became a backup singer for American gospel duo Mary Mary. He also performed on Stevie Wonder's A Time to Love (2005). He later wrote for R&B and gospel artists such as Crystal Aikin, Shirley Caesar, Lalah Hathaway, Joe and Kindred the Family Soul. Later, he performed on Kanye West's single "Impossible," which also features Twista and Keyshia Cole.

2009–2011: Mixtapes
In 2009, Sledge released his debut mixtape, A Taste of Chicago, under the moniker BJ the Chicago Kid. Later that year, he followed up with The New Beginning. In 2011, he released his third mixtape, titled The Life of Love's Cupid.

2012–present: In My Mind and Motown record deal
In February 2012, Sledge independently released his debut studio album, titled Pineapple Now-Laters, under M.A.F.E MUSIC LLC. In August 2012, it was announced that Sledge signed a recording contract with American record company, Motown. After inking his new deal with the label, Motown Label Services began promoting the Pineapple Now-Laters track "Good Luv'n," at Urban and Rhythmic radio formats in North America and released it as a single via digital distribution.

In February 2013, Sledge released the track titled "Honey." Sledge's collaboration with American rappers Freddie Gibbs and Problem, titled "Smokin' and Ridin'", is featured on Radio Los Santos in Grand Theft Auto V, the fifth installment in the critically acclaimed video game series. 
In October 2013, Sledge revealed he began working on his major label debut, which was then announced to be released sometime in 2014. Later that year, in December 2013, Sledge released a Christmas-themed extended play (EP), titled A Soulful Christmas, for free online.

On April 22, 2014, West Coast rapper Schoolboy Q released "Studio", which features vocals from Sledge, as the fourth single from his album Oxymoron. "Studio" acquired Sledge Billboard chart placement and went on to chart in the Top 40 of the US Billboard Hot 100. On November 19, 2014, Sledge released his fourth mixtape, The M.A.F.E. Project. The mixtape features 12 songs and guest appearances from Freddie Gibbs, Sasha Go Hard, Schoolboy Q and Smoke DZA. On December 23, 2014, Motown Records released a song from The M.A.F.E. Project titled "It's True", which features a verse from Schoolboy Q, as a single. The single was accompanied by a music video directed by Verluxe.

On February 19, 2016, Sledge released his major label debut album, "In My Mind".

Sledge released his third studio album, 1123, on July 26, 2019.

Discography

Studio albums

EPs

Mixtapes

Singles

As lead artist

As featured artist

Guest appearances

Music videos

Awards and nominations

Grammy Awards 

|-
|2015
|"Studio" (with Schoolboy Q)
|Best Rap/Sung Collaboration
|
|-
|rowspan="3"|2017
|In My Mind
|Best R&B Album
|
|-
|"Turnin' Me Up"
|Best R&B Performance
|
|-
|"Woman's World"
|Best Traditional R&B Performance
|
|-
|rowspan="1"|2020
|1123
|Best R&B Album
|
|-
|}

References

Notes

External links

 
 

Living people
20th-century African-American male singers
Motown artists
Singers from Chicago
African-American songwriters
Songwriters from Illinois
American contemporary R&B singers
American soul singers
American hip hop singers
1984 births
21st-century American male singers
21st-century American singers
21st-century African-American male singers
American male songwriters